VESA Stereo is a liquid crystal shutter glasses interface standard by the Video Electronics Standards Association (VESA) for stereoscopic 3D displays. The system does not drive the glasses directly, instead providing a basic signal and power to be used by other electronics either inside the glasses or in  an external unit.

The VESA Stereo connector has been extensively used in 3D accelerators as well as 3D DLP TVs.

Technical Details
The stereo-sync signal changes when the system is changing between showing images for the right eye and left eye. The signal is a TTL signal where the "high" state indicates the left eye should be exposed.
No special software is necessarily needed to create the stereo-sync signal as it can be created from the Vertical synchronization signal being fed to the monitor (if it is using RGB component video).

References

External links 

 VESA homepage
Connector and Signal Standards for Stereoscopic Display Hardware

Digital display connectors
VESA
Stereoscopy
3D imaging